The 1903 International Lawn Tennis Challenge was the third edition of what is now known as the Davis Cup. The British Isles team returned to the United States to contest the Cup. The tie was played at the Longwood Cricket Club in Boston, Massachusetts (the same location as the first competition in 1900). The British won 4-1, bringing the Cup to Britain for the first time.

Result
United States vs. British Isles

References

External links
Davis Cup official website

Davis Cups by year
International Lawn Tennis Challenge
International Lawn Tennis Challenge
1903 in sports in Massachusetts
1900s in Boston
Sports competitions in Boston
Tennis tournaments in Massachusetts